Francis Henry Peters was an American college football coach. He served as the head football coach at Maryland Agricultural College—now known as the University of Maryland, College Park—in 1900, compiling a record of 3–4–1.

Biography
A native of Wesley Station, Maryland, Peters attended the Maryland Agricultural College, where he played on the football team as an end from 1898 to 1900. During the 1899 season, Peters served as acting captain in place of Sam Cooke who had suffered an injury, and he was elected team captain and served as player-coach for the 1900 season. The Aggies finished the 1900 season with a 3–4–1 record.

At the Maryland Agricultural College, Peters also played on the baseball team as a right fielder, and competed in the hammer throw, shot put, broad jump and hurdles events as a member of the track and field team.

Head coaching record

References

Year of birth missing
Year of death missing
19th-century players of American football
American football ends
Player-coaches
Maryland Terrapins baseball players
Maryland Terrapins football coaches
Maryland Terrapins football players
Maryland Terrapins men's track and field athletes